Coats of arms are commonly possessed by nations, regions, cities, royal and noble personages, and sometimes by other entities.

Entities

Corporate
 United Kingdom
Coat of arms of the BBC
 City of London Livery Companies
Coat of arms of the Drapers Company, the Worshipful Company of Drapers

Education
 Canada
 Coat of arms of McGill University
 Coat of arms of the University of Toronto

Governmental

Emblem of Afghanistan
Coat of arms of Albania
Coat of arms of Algeria
Coat of arms of Andorra
Coat of arms of Angola
Coat of arms of Argentina
Coat of arms of Armenia
Coat of arms of Artsakh
Coat of arms of Aruba
Coat of arms of Australia
Coat of arms of Australian Capital Territory
Coat of arms of the Northern Territory
Coat of arms of Queensland
Coat of arms of South Australia
Coat of arms of Victoria
Coat of arms of Western Australia
Coat of arms of New South Wales
Coat of arms of Sydney
Coat of arms of Tasmania
Coat of arms of Austria
Coat of arms of the Bahamas
Emblem of Bahrain
Coat of arms of Bangladesh
Coat of arms of Barbados
National emblem of Belarus
Coat of arms of Belgium
Coat of arms of Belize
Coat of arms of Dewsbury
Coat of arms of Bosnia and Herzegovina
Coat of arms of the Federation of Bosnia and Herzegovina
Coat of arms of Republika Srpska
Coat of arms of Sarajevo
Coat of arms of Brazil
Emblem of Brunei
Coat of arms of Bulgaria
Coat of arms of Sofia
Coat of arms of Canada
Coat of arms of Alberta
Coat of arms of Calgary
Coat of arms of Edmonton
Coat of arms of British Columbia
Coat of arms of Abbotsford
Coat of arms of Burnaby
Coat of arms of Coquitlam
Coat of arms of New Westminster
Coat of arms of Port Coquitlam
Coat of arms of Port Moody
Coat of arms of Vancouver
Coat of arms of Victoria
Coat of arms of Manitoba
Coat of arms of Winnipeg
Coat of arms of New Brunswick
Coat of arms of Newfoundland and Labrador
Coat of arms of St. John's
Coat of arms of Nova Scotia
Coat of arms of the Halifax Regional Municipality
Coat of arms of Ontario
Coat of arms of Barrie
Coat of arms of Ottawa
Coat of arms of Peterborough
Coat of arms of St. Thomas
Coat of arms of St. Catharines
Coat of arms of Toronto
Coat of arms of Windsor
Coat of arms of Prince Edward Island
Coat of arms of Charlottetown
Coat of arms of Quebec
Coat of arms of Montreal
Coat of arms of Quebec City
Coat of arms of Saskatchewan
Coat of arms of Regina
Coat of arms of the Northwest Territories
Coat of arms of Yellowknife
Coat of arms of Nunavut
Coat of arms of Yukon
Coat of arms of Whitehorse
Coat of arms of Chile
Emblem of the Republic of China
National Emblem of the People's Republic of China
Emblem of Hong Kong
Emblem of Macau
Coat of arms of Colombia
Coat of arms of Croatia
Coat of arms of Cuba
Seal of Havana
Coat of arms of Cyprus
Coat of arms of the Czech Republic
Coat of arms of Denmark
Coat of arms of the Faroe Islands
Coat of arms of Greenland
Coat of arms of Dominica
Coat of arms of the Dominican Republic
Coat of arms of Egypt
Coat of arms of Eritrea
Coat of arms of Estonia
Emblem of Ethiopia
Coat of arms of Fiji
Coat of arms of Finland
Coat of arms of Åland
Coat of arms of France
Coat of arms of French Polynesia
Coat of arms of Mayotte
Emblem of New Caledonia
Coat of arms of Saint Pierre and Miquelon
Coat of arms of Wallis and Futuna
Coat of arms of Paris
Coat of arms of Georgia
Coat of arms of Germany
Coat of arms of Baden-Württemberg
Coat of arms of Bavaria
Coat of arms of Munich
Coat of arms of Brandenburg
Coat of arms of Berlin
Coat of arms of Bremen
Coat of arms of Hamburg
Coat of arms of Hesse
Coat of arms of Lower Saxony
Coat of arms of Mecklenburg-Vorpommern
Coat of arms of North Rhine-Westphalia
Coat of arms of Rhineland-Palatinate
List of coats of arms of the districts in Rhineland-Palatinate
Coat of arms of Saarland
Coat of arms of Saxony
Coat of arms of Dresden
Coat of arms of Saxony-Anhalt
Coat of arms of Schleswig-Holstein
Coat of arms of Thuringia
Coat of arms of Ghana
Coat of arms of Greece
Emblem of Greek Macedonia
Coat of arms of Grenada
Coat of arms of Haiti
Coat of arms of Hungary
Coat of arms of Iceland
Coat of arms of India
Coat of arms of the Municipal Corporation of Greater Mumbai
Sikkim
Coat of arms of Indonesia
Emblem of Iran
Coat of arms of Iraq
Coat of arms of Ireland
Coat of arms of Israel
Emblem of Jerusalem
Coat of arms of Italy
Coat of arms of Ivory Coast
Coat of arms of Jamaica
Imperial Seal of Japan
Coat of arms of Jordan
Coat of arms of Kazakhstan
Coat of arms of Kenya
Emblem of Kuwait
Coat of arms of Latvia
Coat of arms of Liberia
Coat of arms of Libya
Coat of arms of Liechtenstein
Coat of arms of Lithuania
Coat of arms of Luxembourg
Coat of arms of Madagascar
Coat of arms of Malaysia
Coat of arms of Mali
Coat of arms of Malta
Coat of arms of Mauritius
Coat of arms of Mexico
Seal of Guadalajara
Coat of arms of Moldova
Coat of arms of Monaco
Coat of arms of Montenegro
Coat of arms of Morocco
Coat of arms of Namibia
Coat of arms of the Netherlands
Coat of arms of Amsterdam
Coat of arms of the Netherlands Antilles
Coat of arms of New Zealand
Coat of arms of Niue
Coat of arms of the Cook Islands
Coat of arms of Nigeria
Coat of arms of North Macedonia
Coat of arms of Norway
List of coats of arms of Norway
National emblem of Oman
Coat of arms of Pakistan
Coat of arms of Palestine
Coat of arms of Peru
Coat of arms of the Philippines
Seal of Bangsamoro
Coat of arms of Poland
Coat of arms of Kraków
Coat of arms of Warsaw
Coat of arms of Wrocław
Coat of arms of Portugal
Coat of arms of Lisbon
Coat of arms of Madeira
Coat of arms of the Azores
Emblem of Qatar
Coat of arms of Romania
Coat of arms of Bucharest
Coat of arms of Russia
Coat of arms of Adygea
Altai (image only)
Coat of arms of Bashkortostan
Emblem of Buryatia
Chechnya (image only)
Coat of arms of Crimea
Chuvashia (image only)
Coat of arms of Dagestan
Coat of arms of Ingushetia
Kabardino-Balkaria (image only)
Coat of arms of Kalmykia
Karachay-Cherkessia (image only)
Coat of arms of the Republic of Karelia
Khakassia (image only)
Coat of arms of the Komi Republic
Mari El (image only)
Mordovia (image only)
Coat of arms of North Ossetia-Alania
Sakha (image only)
Coat of arms of Tatarstan
Coat of arms of Tuva
Coat of arms of Udmurtia
Coat of arms of Moscow
Coat of arms of Samoa
Coat of arms of San Marino
Coat of arms of Saudi Arabia
Coat of arms of Serbia
Coat of arms of Vojvodina
Coat of arms of Belgrade
Coat of arms of Novi Sad
Coat of arms of Prijepolje
Coat of arms of Singapore
Coat of arms of Slovakia
Coat of arms of Slovenia
Coat of arms of South Africa
Coat of arms of South Africa (1910–2000)
Coat of arms of South Korea
Coat of arms of South Sudan
Coat of arms of Spain
Emblem of Andalusia
Coat of arms of Aragon
Coat of arms of Asturias
Coat of arms of the Balearic Islands
Coat of arms of Basque Country
Coat of arms of the Canary Islands
Coat of arms of Cantabria
Coat of arms of Castile-La Mancha
Coat of arms of Toledo
Coat of arms of Castile-León
Coat of arms of Catalonia
Coat of arms of Barcelona
Coat of arms of Ceuta
Coat of arms of Extremadura
Coat of arms of Galicia
Coat of arms of the Community of Madrid
Coat of arms of Madrid (city)
Coat of arms of Melilla
Coat of arms of the Region of Murcia
Coat of arms of Navarre
Coat of arms of La Rioja
Coat of arms of the Valencian Community
Coat of arms of the Crown of Aragon (historical)
Coat of arms of the Kingdom, Crown and Historical Region of Castile (historical)
Coat of arms of the Kingdom and Historical Region of León (historical)
Coat of arms of Sri Lanka
Coat of arms of Sweden
Coat of arms of Switzerland
Coat of arms of Syria
Coat of arms of Tanzania
Emblem of Thailand
Coat of arms of Tonga
Coat of arms of Trinidad and Tobago
Coat of arms of Tunisia
Unofficial emblem of Turkey
Coat of arms of Uganda
Coat of arms of Ukraine
Emblem of the United Arab Emirates
Royal arms of Cambodia
Royal coat of arms of the United Kingdom (distinct variant used in Scotland; see also royal coat of arms of Scotland)
Royal arms of England
List of arms of the county councils of England
Coat of arms of London County Council
Coat of arms of the Isle of Wight
Coat of arms of Greater Manchester
Coat of arms of West Yorkshire
London
Coat of arms of the City of London
Coat of arms of the London Borough of Barking and Dagenham
Coat of arms of the London Borough of Barnet
Coat of arms of the London Borough of Bexley
Coat of arms of the London Borough of Brent
Coat of arms of the London Borough of Bromley
Coat of arms of the London Borough of Camden
Coat of arms of the London Borough of Croydon
Coat of arms of the London Borough of Ealing
Coat of arms of the London Borough of Enfield
Coat of arms of the London Borough of Hackney
Coat of arms of the London Borough of Hammersmith and Fulham
Coat of arms of the London Borough of Haringey
Coat of arms of the London Borough of Harrow
Coat of arms of the London Borough of Hillingdon
Coat of arms of the Royal Borough of Greenwich
Coats of arms of metropolitan district councils of England
Coat of arms of Bradford
Coat of arms of Calderdale
Coat of arms of Kirklees
Coat of arms of Leeds
Coat of arms of Sunderland
Coat of arms of Wakefield
Coat of arms of Wigan
Symbols of Manchester
Coats of arms of non-metropolitan district councils
Coat of arms of Barrow-in-Furness
Coat of arms of Colchester
Coat of arms of Oxford
Coats of arms of unitary authority councils of England
Coat of arms of the Isle of Wight
Coat of arms of Poole
Coat of arms of York
Coat of arms of Birmingham
Coat of arms of Liverpool
Royal arms of Scotland
Coat of arms of Northern Ireland
Royal Badge of Wales
Coat of arms of Newport
Overseas Territories
Coat of arms of Anguilla
Coat of arms of Bermuda
Coat of arms of the British Antarctic Territory
Coat of arms of the British Indian Ocean Territory
Coat of arms of the British Virgin Islands
Coat of arms of the Cayman Islands
Coat of arms of the Falkland Islands
Coat of arms of Gibraltar
Coat of arms of Montserrat
Coat of arms of the Pitcairn Islands
Coat of arms of Saint Helena, Ascension and Tristan da Cunha
Coat of arms of Ascension Island
Coat of arms of Saint Helena
Coat of arms of Tristan da Cunha
Coat of arms of South Georgia and the South Sandwich Islands
Crown Dependencies
Coat of arms of Guernsey
Alderney (image only)
Sark (image only)
Herm (image only)
Coat of arms of Jersey
Coat of arms of the Isle of Man
United States - The obverse of the Great Seal of the United States contains the coat of arms of the United States.
Seal of Alabama
Coat of arms of Alabama
Seal of Alaska
Seal of Arizona
Seal of Arkansas
Seal of California
Seal of City of Los Angeles
Seal of Colorado
Seal of Connecticut
Coat of arms of Connecticut
Seal of Delaware
Seal of Florida
Seal of Georgia
Seal of Hawaii
Seal of Idaho
Seal of Illinois
Chicago (image only)
Seal of Indiana
Seal of Iowa
Seal of Kansas
Seal of Kentucky
Seal of Louisiana
Seal of Maine
Seal of Maryland
Seal of Massachusetts
Seal of Michigan
Seal of Minnesota
Seal of Mississippi
Coat of arms of Mississippi
Seal of Missouri
Seal of Montana
Seal of Nebraska
Seal of Nevada
Seal of New Hampshire
Seal of New Jersey
Seal of New Mexico
Seal of New York
Coat of arms of New York
Seal of New York City
Seal of North Carolina
Seal of North Dakota
Coat of arms of North Dakota
Seal of Ohio
Seal of Oklahoma
Seal of Oregon
Seal of Pennsylvania
Coat of arms of Pennsylvania
Philadelphia (image only)
Seal of Rhode Island
Seal of South Carolina
Seal of South Dakota
Seal of Tennessee
Seal of Texas
Seal of Utah
Seal of Vermont
Coat of arms of Vermont
Seal of Virginia
Seal of Washington
Seal of West Virginia
Seal of Wisconsin
Seal of Wyoming
Seal of the District of Columbia
Seal of American Samoa
Seal of Guam
Seal of Northern Mariana Islands
Seal of Puerto Rico
Seal of the United States Virgin Islands
Coat of arms of the Holy See (Vatican City)
Coat of arms of Venezuela
Armorial of Venezuela
Emblem of Vietnam
Emblem of Yemen
Coat of arms of Zimbabwe

Former states
Coat of arms of the Socialist Federal Republic of Yugoslavia
Coats of arms of the Yugoslav Socialist Republics
Coat of arms of the Soviet Union
Coats of arms of the Soviet Republics

Former dependencies

Coat of arms of British Hong Kong
Coat of arms of Portuguese Macau

Positions

Denmark
Coat of arms of the Queen
Coat of arms of the Crown Prince
Coat of arms of Prince Joachim
Coat of arms of the Crown Princess
Coat of arms of Princess Marie
Luxembourg
Coat of arms of the Grand Duke
Coat of arms of the Hereditary Grand Duke
The Netherlands
Coat of arms of the Queen
Coat of arms of the Princess of Orange
Coat of arms of Princesses Alexia and Ariane
Coat of arms of Princess Beatrix 
Coat of arms of Prince Constantijn 
Coat of arms of Princesses Irene, Margriet and Christina
Coat of arms of Princes Maurits, Bernhard, Pieter-Christiaan and Floris
Norway
Coat of arms of the King
Coat of arms of the Crown Prince
Spain
Coat of arms of the King
Coat of arms of the Princess of Asturias 
Coat of arms of King Juan Carlos
The Commonwealth
Coat of arms of the Duke of Edinburgh
Coat of arms of the Prince of Wales
Coat of arms of the Duchess of Cornwall
Coat of arms of the Princess Royal
Coat of arms of the Duke of York
Coat of arms of the Earl of Wessex
Coat of arms of the Countess of Wessex
Coat of arms of the Duke of Cambridge
Coat of arms of Prince Harry
Coat of arms of Princess Beatrice of York
Coat of arms of Princess Eugenie of York
Coat of arms of the Duke of Gloucester
Coat of arms of the Duchess of Gloucester
Coat of arms of the Duke of Kent
Coat of arms of the Duchess of Kent
Coat of arms of Prince Michael of Kent
Coat of arms of the Princess Michael of Kent
Coat of arms of Princess Alexandra
United States
Seal of the President of the United States
Seal of the Vice President of the United States
 Presidents and vice presidents of the United States (personal):
 List of personal coats of arms of presidents of the United States
 List of personal coats of arms of vice presidents of the United States
Vatican City
Coat of arms of Francis
Former Papal Coats of Arms

Family
Carpenter
Daniel Perrin
De la Cerda
Mariñelarena

See also
 List of oldest heraldry
National emblems

References

Coats of arms